Diane Louise Salinger (born January 25, 1951) is an American actress. She is best known for Apollonia in Carnivàle (2003–2005).

Filmography

Film

Television

Video games 
 The Elder Scrolls V: Skyrim (2011)

External links

1951 births
American film actresses
American television actresses
American voice actresses
Living people
Actresses from Wilmington, Delaware
Columbia University alumni
American women comedians
21st-century American women